Saadatabad (also Romanized as Sa‘ādatābād) is a village in Jarqavieh Vosta Rural District, Jarqavieh Sofla District, Isfahan County, Isfahan Province, Iran. At the 2006 census, its population was 478, in 128 families.

References 

Populated places in Isfahan County